John Andrew Millar (8 July 1855 – 15 October 1915) was a New Zealand politician of the Liberal Party from Otago.

Early life
Born in Jalandhar, India, in 1855, he first came to New Zealand in 1870, but then embarked on a seafaring career. In 1881, he changed from international to coastal shipping. Although an officer, he was a member of the union. When he was elected the first full-time general secretary of the Federated Seamen's Union of New Zealand in 1887, he moved to Port Chalmers, as that is where the union's headquarters were.

Political career

He was a Member of Parliament for Chalmers in the 12th Parliament –1896, for the City of Dunedin in the 13th, 14th and 15th Parliaments –1905, for Dunedin Central in the 16th Parliament –1908, and for Dunedin West in the 17th and 18th Parliaments –1914.

He disagreed with some Liberal policies, but did not join the New Liberal Party group in 1905.

Millar was Chairman of Committees from 1903 to 1905. He was Minister of Customs (6 August 1906 – 6 January 1909), Minister of Labour (6 August 1906 – 6 January 1909; 17 June 1909 – 28 March 1912), Minister in Charge of Marine Department (6 August 1906 – 28 March 1912), and Minister of Railways (6 January 1909 – 28 March 1912) in the Ward Ministry.

In 1912 he was spoken of as a successor to Sir Joseph Ward as leader of the Liberal Party. But he did not stand in the ballot of 22 March when Thomas Mackenzie defeated George Laurenson (with 22 votes to 9) as he was not supported by Labour members of the caucus, although he had support from "arbitrationist" unions. So in July he appeared in the House to help turn out the Liberal government ... ill, pyjama-clad, consumed with the desire to destroy the government that he had not been permitted to lead.

He was appointed to the Legislative Council on 23 June 1915, but could only attend one meeting to be sworn in before his health failed him.  He died in Auckland on 15 October 1915 and was buried in the Dunedin Northern Cemetery.

Notes

References

|-

|-

1855 births
1915 deaths
New Zealand Liberal Party MPs
Members of the Cabinet of New Zealand
Members of the New Zealand Legislative Council
New Zealand Liberal Party MLCs
New Zealand MPs for Dunedin electorates
People from Port Chalmers
Members of the New Zealand House of Representatives
Unsuccessful candidates in the 1890 New Zealand general election
Burials at Dunedin Northern Cemetery
19th-century New Zealand politicians